Edward Doyle (born November 30, 1935) is a former politician in Ontario, Canada.  He was a Progressive Conservative member of the Legislative Assembly of Ontario from 1995 to 1999.

Background
Doyle was educated in Montreal, and did not attend university.  He worked as a radio and television news journalist in Montreal, Kitchener and Hamilton, and was a member of the Experimental Aircraft Association.

Politics
Doyle was elected to the Ontario legislature in the Hamilton-area riding of Wentworth East in the 1995 provincial election, defeating Liberal Shirley Collins and incumbent New Democrat Mark Morrow by a plurality of about 3,606 votes.  He served for the next four years as a backbench supporter of Mike Harris's government.  He did not play a major role in parliament, though he stood in as speaker of the assembly from September 26 to October 2, 1996, after the resignation of Al McLean.

Doyle supported amalgamating the city of Hamilton, and co-chaired a series of provincial consultations on the Canada Pension Plan in 1996.  He did not seek re-election in 1999.

References

External links
 

1935 births
Living people
Progressive Conservative Party of Ontario MPPs
Speakers of the Legislative Assembly of Ontario